Perma-Pipe International Holdings, Inc. (formerly MFRI Inc. or Midwesco Filter Resources Inc.) is a global company providing piping systems, filtration products and cooling equipment. It operates its business through three segments including Piping System segment, Filtration Product segment and Industrial Process Cooling segments. The company owns some intellectual properties including three registered trademarks: Thermal Care, AWS and Applied Web Systems.

Background
The company was incorporated in 1993 and is based in Niles, Illinois. The company’s products are widely used in piping system, filtration and industrial process cooling. Besides, it also runs the business of the setup of heating, ventilation and air conditioning systems although the business is not big enough to form a segment. Process Cooling segment is engaged in providing cooling and temperature control equipment for industrial applications. The products of the company are sold to the manufacturers and suppliers in industry. As of February 2013, there are about 1,212 employees working for the company worldwide. The company changed its named from MFRI to Perma-Pipe in 2017.

References 

Companies established in 1989
Companies listed on the Nasdaq